Karl Þráinsson (born 10 August 1965) is an Icelandic former handball player who competed in the 1988 Summer Olympics.

References

1965 births
Living people
Karl Thrainsson
Karl Thrainsson
Handball players at the 1988 Summer Olympics